The São João River is a tributary of the Pitangui River in Paraná state, southern Brazil.

See also
List of rivers of Paraná

References
Brazilian Ministry of Transport

Rivers of Paraná (state)